= Stars League =

Stars League may refer to:

- Qatar Stars League, the top level football league in Qatar
- Iraq Stars League, the top level football league in Iraq
